Martin Airfield  is a recreational aerodrome in Martin, Slovakia. It features a grass runway of 800 metres length, several club buildings, and hangars.

Airlines and Destinations
As of February 2022, there are no scheduled passenger services to/from Martin Airfield.

References

 International Civil Aviation Organization, Location Indicators, Edition No. 128 (June 2008), p. 4-40.

External links
 
 

Airports in Slovakia
Martin, Slovakia